Allerton Garden, also known as Lāwai-kai, is a botanical garden, originally created by Robert Allerton and John Gregg Allerton, located on the south shore of Kauai, Hawaii. The garden covers an  area and is situated beside the Lāwai Bay, in a valley transected by the Lāwai Stream. It is one of the five gardens of the non-profit National Tropical Botanical Garden.

Garden history

Queen Emma of Hawaii resided above this valley for a short interval, and a modest house that was perhaps her residence has subsequently been moved to the valley floor and renovated. The entire valley, including what is now the adjacent McBryde Garden, was purchased by the McBryde family in the late 19th century for a sugarcane plantation.

Robert Allerton, who had a lifelong passion for garden design, sculpture, and landscape architecture had already expressed it at "The Farms" estate and sculpture gardens in Illinois (now Robert Allerton Park). His adopted son John Gregg Allerton had studied architecture at the University of Illinois in the 1920s.  In 1938 they came to Hawaii and purchased a relatively small portion of Queen Emma's plantation for a residence and gardens. They quickly began designing the landscape master plan and individual gardens, incorporating Hawaiian and new plants they had acquired from tropical Asia and other Pacific Islands, built landscape elements, and sculptures from "The Farms."

Tropical Botanical Garden
Allerton would later join a group of individuals and organizations who were pushing for the establishment of a tropical botanical garden on U.S. soil. In his final year before he died, Allerton was able to witness the charter being granted and the creation of the Pacific Tropical Botanical Garden (now National Tropical Botanical Garden). John Gregg Allerton maintained the garden until his death in 1986, and left it in trust. In the early 1990s, management was assumed by the National Tropical Botanical Garden and the garden was named after its founding fathers.

Garden touring
Allerton Garden includes garden rooms, pools, miniature waterfalls, fountains, and statues. It is open to visitors. An admission fee is charged.

Films and TV
This picturesque setting has been used in a number of films and TV shows, including South Pacific, Donovan's Reef, Jurassic Park, Pirates of the Caribbean, Starsky and Hutch and Magnum, P.I.

See also 

 Robert Allerton Park ("The Farms")
 Limahuli Garden and Preserve
 Kahanu Garden
 The Kampong
 List of botanical gardens and arboretums in the United States
 Landscape

References

 National Tropical Botanical Garden: Allerton Garden (brochure), May 2006.
 The Robert Allerton Story, by Kathryn Hulme, National Tropical Botanical Garden.

External links

 Official Allerton Garden website

Gardens in Hawaii
Historic house museums in Hawaii
History of Kauai
Museums in Kauai County, Hawaii
Open-air museums in Hawaii
Outdoor sculptures in Hawaii
Botanical gardens in Hawaii
Cultural landscapes
Parks in Hawaii
Nature reserves in Hawaii
Landscape design history of the United States
Protected areas of Kauai
Sculpture gardens, trails and parks in Oceania
Sculpture gardens, trails and parks in the United States
Protected areas established in 1986
1938 establishments in Hawaii